Percina is a genus of small freshwater ray-finned fish, classified within the subfamily Etheostomatinae, part of the family Percidae, which also contains the perches, ruffes and pikeperches from North America. Like the similar fishes in the genus Etheostoma, they are some species called "darters". More specifically, the genus as a whole is known as roughbelly darters, while certain species of Percina with a pattern of vertical bars on the flanks are called logperches.

Species
There are currently 49 recognized species in this genus:
 Percina antesella J. D. Williams & Etnier, 1978 (Amber darter)
 Percina apristis C. L. Hubbs & Hubbs, 1954 (Guadalupe darter)
 Percina aurantiaca Cope, 1868 (Tangerine darter)
 Percina aurolineata Suttkus & Ramsey, 1967 (Goldline darter)
 Percina aurora Suttkus & B. A. Thompson, 1994 (Pearl darter)
 Percina austroperca B. A. Thompson, 1995 (Southern logperch)
 Percina bimaculata Haldeman, 1844 (Chesapeake logperch)
 Percina brevicauda Suttkus & Bart, 1994 (Coal darter)
 Percina brucethompsoni Robinson, Cashner & Near, 2014 (Ouachita darter)
 Percina burtoni Fowler, 1945 (Blotchside darter)
 Percina caprodes Rafinesque, 1810 (Common logperch)
 Percina carbonaria Baird & Girard, 1853 (Texas logperch)
 Percina copelandi D. S. Jordan, 1877 (Channel darter)
 Percina crassa D. S. Jordan & Brayton, 1878 (Piedmont darter)
 Percina crypta M. C. Freeman, B. J. Freeman, Burkhead  & Straight, 2008 (Halloween darter)
 Percina cymatotaenia Gilbert & Meek, 1887 (Bluestripe darter)
 Percina evides D. S. Jordan & Copeland, 1877 (Gilt darter)
 Percina freemanorum Near, MacGuigan, Boring, Simmons, Albanese, Keck, Harrington & Dinkins, 2021 (Etowah Bridled Darter)
 Percina fulvitaenia Morris & Page, 1981 (Ozark logperch)
 Percina gymnocephala Beckham, 1980 (Appalachia darter)
 Percina jenkinsi B. A. Thompson, 1985 (Conasauga logperch)
 Percina kathae B. A. Thompson, 1997 (Mobile logperch)
 Percina kusha J. D. Williams & Burkhead, 2007 (Bridled darter)
 Percina lenticula Richards & L. W. Knapp, 1964 (Freckled darter)
 Percina macrocephala Cope, 1867 (Longhead darter)
 Percina macrolepida Stevenson, 1971 (Bigscale logperch)
 Percina maculata Girard, 1859 (Blackside darter)
 Percina nasuta Bailey, 1941 (Longnose darter)
 Percina nevisense Cope, 1870 (Chainback darter)
 Percina nigrofasciata Agassiz, 1854 (Blackbanded darter)
 Percina notogramma Raney & C. L. Hubbs, 1948 (Stripeback darter)
 Percina oxyrhynchus C. L. Hubbs & Raney, 1939 (Sharpnose darter)
 Percina palmaris Bailey, 1940 (Bronze darter)
 Percina pantherina Moore & Reeves, 1955 (Leopard darter)
 Percina peltata Stauffer, 1864 (Shield darter)
 Percina phoxocephala E. W. Nelson, 1876 (Slenderhead darter)
 Percina rex D. S. Jordan & Evermann, 1889 (Roanoke logperch)
 Percina roanoka D. S. Jordan & O. P. Jenkins, 1889 (Roanoke darter)
 Percina sciera Swain, 1883 (Dusky darter)
 Percina shumardi Girard, 1859 (River darter)
 Percina sipsi J. D. Williams & Neely, 2007 (Bankhead darter)
 Percina smithvanizi J. D. Williams & Walsh, 2007 (Muscadine darter)
 Percina squamata Gilbert & Swain, 1887 (Olive darter)
 Percina stictogaster Burr & Page, 1993 (Frecklebelly darter)
 Percina suttkusi B. A. Thompson, 1997 (Gulf logperch)
 Percina tanasi Etnier, 1976 (Snail darter)
 Percina uranidea D. S. Jordan & Gilbert, 1887 (Stargazing darter)
 Percina vigil O. P. Hay, 1882 (Saddleback darter)
 Percina williamsi Page & Near, 2007 (Sickle darter)

References

Etheostomatinae
Taxa named by Samuel Stehman Haldeman